Chichimeca or Chichimeca Jonaz is an indigenous language of Mexico spoken by around 200 Chichimeca Jonaz people in Misión de Chichimecas near San Luis de la Paz in the state of Guanajuato. The Chichimeca  Jonaz language belongs to the Oto-Pamean branch of the Oto-Manguean language family. The Chichimecos self identify as úza and call their language eza'r.

Distribution

The language is currently spoken only in San Luis de la Paz (Guanajuato), in the settlements of Berlín, Buenavista (El Cuernito), Cerro Blanco, Colonia Benito Juárez [Plan Benito Juárez], Ejido Santa Ana y Lobos (Fracción de Lourdes), El Desmonte, El Sauz Tres, El Tepetate, Exhacienda de Ortega (Ejido Ortega), Garibaldi (El Cerrito), La Ciénega, La Curva, La Huerta, La Laguna (La Lagunita), La Leona, La Mesa de Jesús, La Norita, Los Dolores (Las Quince Letras), Lourdes (Estación de Lourdes), Maguey Blanco, Manzanares, Mesa de Escalante, Mesa de la Estacada, Mesa del Pueblo, Misión de Chichimecas, Norita del Refugio, Parajes, Paso Colorado, Piedras de Lumbre, Pozo Hondo (Exhacienda de Pozo Hondo), Puerto de la Virginita, Puerto del Gato, Rancho Nuevo de las Trojes, San Antonio Chiquito, San Antonio Primero, San Ignacio, San Isidro de Pozos (San Isidrito), San José del Carmen, and San Pedro de los Pozos (Mineral de Pozos). In 1934, Jacques Soustelle counted 452 chichimecas, 63 of whom were children who attended the local school.
Prior to that point the language was spoken in five other locations:

 Misión Arnedo (Guanajuato) to the east of San Luis, near Villa Victoria.
 Misión de las Palmas (Querétaro), along the Etorax river, which arises near Victoria.
 Misión de Santa Rosa, to the north of Victoria.
 San Pedro Tolimán, where a mission was established in the 18th century, which failed, however, and the chichimecas abandoned the area. It was later repopulated with Otomís.
 Villa Colón (Querétaro), to the south of Tolimán.

Phonology
Chichimeca Jonaz is a tonal language and distinguishes high and low level tones.

There are also fortis-lenis versions of the nasal consonants: m and n.

Notes

References
 
 
 
</ref>
 

Mesoamerican languages
Indigenous languages of Mexico
Oto-Pamean languages
Endangered Oto-Manguean languages